The northern cavefish or northern blindfish (Amblyopsis spelaea) is found in caves through Kentucky and southern Indiana. It is listed as a threatened species in the United States and the IUCN lists the species as near threatened.

During a 2013 study of Amblyopsis spelaea, scientists found that the species was divided into two distinct evolutionary lineages: one north of the Ohio River, in Indiana, and one south of the river, in Kentucky.  The southern population retained the name A. spelaea and the northern was re-designated Amblyopsis hoosieri in a 2014 paper published in the journal ZooKeys. Neither species is found north of the White River, flowing east to west south of Bedford, Indiana.

References

 

Amblyopsidae
Cave fish
Cavefish, Northern
Fish of the United States
Fish described in 1842
Taxa named by James Ellsworth De Kay
Mammoth Cave National Park